The 2013 European Cup Combined Events were held in Tallinn, Estonia, at the Kadriorg Stadium (Super league), in Nottwil, Lucerne, Switzerland, at the Sport Arena Nottwil (First league), and in Ribeira Brava, Madeira, Portugal, at the Estadio de Camara de Lobos (Second league), on 29–30 June 2013.

Super league
Detailed reports on the event and an appraisal of the results were given.

Complete results were published.

Medallists

Results

Overall Team

Men's Decathlon
Key

Women's Heptathlon
Key

Participation
An unofficial count yields the participation of 64 athletes from 8 countries.

 (8)
 (8)
 (8)

 (8)
 (8)
 (8)

 (8)
 (8)

First league
Detailed reports on the event and an appraisal of the results were given.

Complete results were published.

Results

Men's Decathlon
Key

Women's Heptathlon
Key

Overall Team

Participation
An unofficial count yields the participation of 56 athletes from 7 countries.

 (8)
 (8)
 (8)

 (8)
 (8)

 (8)
 (8)

Second league
Detailed reports on the event and an appraisal of the results were given.

Complete results were published.

Results

Men's Decathlon
Key

Women's Heptathlon
Key

Team

Participation
An unofficial count yields the participation of 35 athletes from 9 countries.

 (1)
 (1)
 (2)
 (7)
 (1)
 (7)
 (6)
 (6)
 (4)

References

European Combined Events Team Championships
European Cup Combined Events
European Cup Combined Events
European Cup Combined Events
International athletics competitions hosted by Switzerland
European Cup Combined Events
International athletics competitions hosted by Portugal
European Cup Combined Events